Yorgo Voyagis (born 6 December 1945) is a Greek actor.

Career as an actor
Voyagis' film debut was in Michael Cacoyannis's Zorba the Greek (1964). He reappeared three years later in the Italian Western Killer Kid.

Voyagis then starred in the film Chronicle of the Years of Fire by Mohammed Lakhdar-Hamina (1975). In The Ballad of Mamluk Abdelhafidh Bouassida (1982), he played the titular role alongside Bekim Fehmiu and Irene Papas. He also played  Joseph alongside Olivia Hussey (Mary) in Franco Zeffirelli's TV Production of Jesus of Nazareth in 1977, in which he powerfully portrayed a strong, yet humble, man.

In the following years, his career was divided between television and film, from one country to another: from the French series X with Capt. Pierre Malet; the film The Little Drummer Girl by George Roy Hill, opposite Diane Keaton an episode of Miami Vice and the movie Julia and Julia by Peter Del Monte, with Kathleen Turner. After a role alongside Klaus Kinski and Harvey Keitel, Voyagis played the kidnapper in Frantic by Roman Polanski. The same year, he appeared in the series The Fortunate Pilgrim by Mario Puzo, with Sophia Loren in dispensing head. The actor found Kinski in Nosferatu in Venice and Venice in Rosso veneziano to Etienne Perier, in 1989, he also appeared in an episode of the American television series China Beach.

He also played in the horror film Vortice mortale and Detective Zaras, Paris Aristeidis hero in a series in 1991.

In 1997 he was Agamemnon in the blockbuster television The Odyssey, produced by Andrei Konchalovsky, and he participated with Claudia Cardinale and Guy Bedos in Rachida Krim's Under the Feet of Women. Since then, his work has included: a movie of adventure and fantasy directed by Pupi Avati in 2001 (as Raoul Bova, Edward Furlong, Stanislas Merhar and F. Murray Abraham), Swept Away by Guy Ritchie (in the role of the captain) and Without Borders (2010) alongside George Corraface (of Greek origin) and Seymour Cassel.

Yorgo Voyagis remains active in Greece and Italy.

Filmography
Sources:

1964: Zorba the Greek (Alexis Zorbas) by Michael Cacoyannis, Pavlo
1967: Killer Kid by Leopoldo Savona, Pablo
1967: To prosopo tis Medousas by Nikos Koundouros
1968: Giarrettiera Colt by Gian Rocco, Carlos
1968: L'età del malessere by Giuliano Biagetti
1969: Cuore di mamma by Salvatore Samperi, Carlo
1970: The Adventurers (The Adventurers) by Lewis Gilbert, El Lobo
1970: The Last Valley (The Last Valley) by James Clavell, Pirelli
1975: Orlando furioso (TV series) by Luca Ronconi
1975: Chronicle of the Years of Fire by Mohammed Lakhdar-Hamina, Ahmed
1977: Jesus of Nazareth (by Franco Zeffirelli) - Joseph
1977: The New Monsters (I nuovi mostri) by Mario Monicelli, Dino Risi and Ettore Scola, the terrorist
1978: Nero veneziano by Ugo Liberatore, Dan
1981: Un'assistente tutta pepe by Nando Cicero, Bel Ami
1981: A girl really nice (L'amante da tutta scoprire) by Giuliano Carnimeo, Nicki
1982: La casa stregata by Bruno Corbucci, Omar
1982: The Ballad of Mamluk (Sarab) by Abdelhafidh Bouassida, Mamluk
1982: Eccezzziunale ... veramente by Carlo Vanzina, Slavo
1982: Sesso e volentieri by Dino Risi, Lover of Pino
1983: Captain X (TV series) by Bruno Gantillon, Ismet
1983: O stohos by Nikos Foskolos, Tasos Seretis
1984: The Little Drummer Girl by George Roy Hill, Joseph
1986: The Boss (TV series) by Silverio Blasi
1986: Naso di cane (TV miniseries) by Pasquale Squitieri, Achille Ammirato
1987: Nel gorgo del peccato (TV series) by Frazzi Andrea and Antonio Frazzi
1987: Miami Vice (TV series, one episode) created by Anthony Yerkovich, Alexander Dykstra
1987: Giulia e Giulia by Peter Del Monte, Goffredo
1988: Grandi cacciatori by Augusto Caminito, Leader
1988: Frantic by Roman Polanski, the Kidnapper
1988: The Fortunate Pilgrim (TV series) by Stuart Cooper , Tony
1988: The Bourne Identity by Roger Young, Carlos
1988: Nosferatu in Venice (Nosferatu a Venezia) by Augusto Caminito, Dr. Barneval
1989: China Beach (TV series, one episode) created by John Sacret Young and William Broyles Jr., Turner
1989: Rosso veneziano by Etienne Perier, Torelli
1990: Courage Mountain by Christopher Leitch, Signor Bonelli
1991: I agapi tis gatas (TV series) by Andreas Thomopoulos, Detective Zaras
1992: L'ispettore Anticrimine (TV series) by Paolo Fondato
1993: Vortice Mortale by Ruggero Deodato, Yuri Petkov
1994: Running Delilah by Richard Franklin, Alec Kasharian
1996: Earth indigo (TV Series) by Jean Sagols, Alvarez Corea
1997: Jeavaeri (TV Series) by Giorgos Kordelas Antonis
1997: The Odyssey (The Odyssey) by Andrei Konchalovsky, Agamemnon
1997: Under the feet of women by Rachida Krim, Moncef 1996
1999: Guardami by Davide Ferrario, Father of Nina
2000: ...Ystera, irthan oi Melisses (TV series) by Kostas Koutsomytis, Stathis Horafas
2000: The Prince of Arabia (Der Prinz arabische) by Peter Deutsch and Karola Meeder, Prinz Mahib
2001: I Cavalieri che fecero l'impresa by Pupi Avati , Isacco Sathas
2001: Beautiful People by Nikos Panayotopoulos
2002: L'inverno by Nina Di Majo, Gustavo
2002: Lilly's Story by Robert Manthoulis George
2002:  Swept Away by Guy Ritchie, Captain
2003: Leni (TV series) by Lambis Zaroutiadis Petros
2004: Signora by Francesco Laudadio, Basilio
2004: Arhipelagos (TV series) by Vasilis Karfis, Manola Stella and Nikos Zapatinas, Stratis
2006: An m 'agapas (TV series) by Stratos Markidis
2007: Yungermann (TV series, 2 episodes), Ademar From Kresy
2009: Without Borders by Nick Gaitatjis, Thanasis
2012: The Day of the Siege: September Eleven 1683 by Renzo Martinelli, Abu'l
2017: Dove non ho mai abitato'' by Paolo Franchi

References

External links 

 

1945 births
Greek male film actors
Greek male television actors
Male actors from Athens
Living people